Daniel Siboni (born June 2, 1959) is a French photographer.

In 2013, he opened a Gallery in Tel Aviv in Israel (Urban Secret Gallery) and the "Daniel Siboni Factory" in 2017 and was the Art Director of the museum of Tel Aviv exhibition "80th Batman birthday". |url=https://m.jpost.com/Israel-News/Israel-votes-Batman-Can-the-worlds-greatest-detective-form-a-govt-611861 |accessdate=January 13, 2017 |publisher=The Jerusalem Post |date=December 12, 2017}}</ref>

In 2018, the DAN GROUP entrusted to Daniel Siboni the conception and artistic direction of a Street Art hotel's line., the first of which has the link hotel and hub, a gallery on 8 floors in Tel Aviv.

References

danielsiboni.com

1959 births
French photographers
Fashion photographers
Living people
French people of Moroccan-Jewish descent
Portrait photographers